Saint Paul's Church is a historic church building in Malacca City, Malaysia that was originally built in 1521, making it the oldest church building in Malaysia and Southeast Asia. It is located at the summit of St. Paul's Hill and is today part of the Malacca Museum Complex comprising the A Famosa ruins, the Stadthuys and other historical buildings.

History of the church 
The original structure was a simple chapel built in 1521 dedicated to the Virgin Mary and known as the Nossa Senhora da Annunciada (Our Lady of the Annunciation). The chapel was built by a Portuguese fidalgo or nobleman, Duarte Coelho, as an act of gratitude following his escape from a storm in the South China Sea.

The chapel was deeded to the Society of Jesus in 1548 by the Bishop of Goa, João Afonso de Albuquerque, with the title deeds received by St. Francis Xavier. The chapel was then further enlarged in 1556 with the addition of a second floor, and a belfry tower was added in 1590. The chapel was then renamed the Igreja de Madre de Deus (Church of the Mother of God).

A burial vault was opened in 1592 and many people of distinction were buried there, including Pedro Martins, the second Bishop of Funay, Japan.

Association with St. Francis Xavier 
In 1548, St. Francis Xavier with the help of fellow Jesuits, Fr. Francisco Peres and Brother Roque de Oliveira, established a school in the premises of the chapel known as St. Paul's College. This was perhaps the first school in the modern sense to be established on the Malay peninsula.

Xavier used the church as his base for his missionary journeys to China and Japan. On one of those journeys, Xavier fell sick and in 1552 in Shangchuan Island, China he died.

In 1553, the body of Xavier was disinterred from Shangchuan Island and temporarily buried at the church before it was finally shipped to Goa. An open grave in the church still exists today marking the place of Xavier's burial.

Reconsecration and abandonment 

With the conquest of Malacca by the Dutch in 1641, the church was reconsecrated for Dutch Reformed use as St. Paul's Church also known as the Bovenkerk or High Church. The church remained in use as the main church of the Dutch community until the new Bovenkerk (better known today as Christ Church Malacca) was completed in 1753.

The old church was then subsequently deconsecrated and the structure modified and strengthened as part of the fortifications of Malacca. The nave of the church was then used as a churchyard.

When the British occupied Malacca in 1824, the church was used as a powder magazine and was allowed to deteriorate further.

Excavations and later additions 

Efforts to preserve records of monuments from the past such as the tombstones found in St. Paul's Church were photographed by the Resident Councillor of Malacca, Robert Norman Bland and published in his 1905 work, Historical Tombstones of Malacca.

In 1849, a now-defunct lighthouse, which consists mainly of a lantern and gallery mounted on an arched base and is solely accessible from ground level via a small ladder, was installed in front of the church as an additional beacon for ships travelling along the Strait of Malacca. It is an approximately 13 metre (43 feet) high, three-storey square white tower, which adopted basic elements from neoclassical architecture with no outbuildings, assuming an angular form different from many of its cylindrical and cone shaped counterparts throughout the region.

In 1924, the old Portuguese burial vault in the chancel of the church was partially uncovered. Further excavation was done in 1930 by the president of the newly formed Malacca Historical Society, Major C. E. Bone. It was in this period that the tombstones that were scattered around in the vicinity of the church were affixed to the walls.

In 1952, a statue of St. Francis Xavier was erected in front of the ruins of the church in commemoration of the 400th anniversary of his sojourn in Malacca. A day after the statue was consecrated, a large casuarina tree fell on it, breaking off its right arm. Incidentally, the right forearm of Xavier was detached in 1614 as a relic.

See also 
 Roman Catholicism in Malaysia
 Portuguese Malacca
 List of Jesuit sites

References

External links 

 

1521 establishments in the Portuguese Empire
Churches in Malacca
Religious buildings and structures completed in 1521
Portuguese colonial architecture in Malaysia